Ponta Jalunga is a headland located nearly a kilometer northeast of the port of Furna on the island of Brava in southwestern Cape Verde. It is the northeasternmost point of the island. The promontory is a rocky area, up to 120 meters high. The headland was mentioned as Pt. Ghelongo in the 1747 map by Jacques-Nicolas Bellin.

Ponta Jalunga Lighthouse
The lighthouse at Ponta Jalunga was constructed in 1891. It is a white masonry tower. It is 8 metres tall and its focal height is at 26 metres above sea level.

See also
List of lighthouses in Cape Verde

References 

Geography of Brava, Cape Verde
Jalunga
Lighthouses in Cape Verde